Matthew Arnone (born 28 February 1994) is a Canadian professional soccer player who plays as a centre-back.

Club career

Early career
From 2012 to 2016, Arnone attended York University, where he made a total of 70 appearances for the Lions and scored five goals. In 2015 and 2016, Arnone played for League1 Ontario side Vaughan Azzurri, making five league appearances in 2016.

North Carolina FC U23
In 2017, Arnone signed with American Premier Development League side North Carolina FC U23, where he made fourteen appearances and scored a goal before leaving in July 2017.

Vaughan Azzurri
In July 2017, Arnone returned to Canada and the Vaughan Azzurri, making another ten appearances and scoring one goal in league play. In 2018, Arnone made fifteen league appearances and another four in the playoffs as Vaughan won the league-cup double.

In winter 2018–19, Arnone spent five months training with Italian Serie D side Vis Artena.

HFX Wanderers
On 1 May 2019, Arnone signed his first professional contract with Canadian Premier League side HFX Wanderers. On 12 May 2019, he made his debut as a starter in a 1–0 loss to Valour FC. On 14 December 2019, the club announced that Arnone would not return for the 2020 season.

York9
On 18 February 2020, Arnone signed with his hometown club, York9.

Atlético Ottawa
On 7 August 2021, Arnone signed with Atlético Ottawa. He scored his first goal on November7 in a 1-1 draw against HFX Wanderers FC and immediately getting sent off after earning a second yellow for kicking the corner flag during his celebration. On 13 January 2022, Ottawa chose not to exercise its contract option on Arnone.

Honours
Vaughan Azzurri
 League1 Ontario Cup: 2016, 2018
 League1 Ontario: 2018

HFX Wanderers
 Player of the Year: 2019

References

External links
 

1994 births
Living people
Association football defenders
Canadian soccer players
Soccer people from Ontario
People from Vaughan
Canadian sportspeople of Italian descent
Canadian expatriate soccer players
Expatriate soccer players in the United States
Canadian expatriate sportspeople in the United States
York Lions soccer players
North Carolina FC U23 players
Vaughan Azzurri players
HFX Wanderers FC players
York United FC players
Atlético Ottawa players
League1 Ontario players
USL League Two players
Canadian Premier League players